Paul Patterson may refer to:

Paul Patterson (neuroscientist) (1943–2014), American neuroscientist
Paul L. Patterson (1900–1956), American politician
Paul Patterson (footballer) (born 1965), Australian rules footballer
Paul Patterson (composer) (born 1947), British composer
Paul Patterson (comics), comic book character

See also 
Paul Patterson Timman (born 1972), American artist
Paul L. Patterson Elementary School, an American elementary school
Patterson (surname)